Stepnica  (formerly , or Bad Stepenitz) is a town in Goleniów County, West Pomeranian Voivodeship, in north-western Poland. It is the seat of the gmina (administrative district) called Gmina Stepnica.

Municipal law was given on January 1, 2014. The town has a population of 2,067.

Stepnica is situated near the estuary of the Oder River - Roztoka Odrzańska, south of the Szczecin Lagoon on the route canoe between Police and Trzebież.

References

Goleniów County
Cities and towns in West Pomeranian Voivodeship
Port cities and towns in Poland